Streetsounds was a radio show on Radio Clyde in the late 1970s hosted by Brian Ford and specialising in punk rock, new wave and ska music. It aired on Wednesday evenings.

References
http://www.clyde2.com/sectional.asp?ID=553

External links
 http://theprimalscream.com/press/uncut-nov99.html
Scottish radio programmes
Culture in Glasgow
1970s in Scotland